Peter Victor Hobbs (1936–2005) was a British-born professor of atmospheric sciences and director of the Cloud and Aerosol Research Group at the University of Washington. His research interests were in the physics and chemistry of the atmosphere, focusing on the roles played by aerosols, clouds, and precipitation. He authored over 250 peer-reviewed papers, authored four books, and edited three books. He was the coauthor with John Michael Wallace of what is generally considered the standard introductory textbook in the field: Atmospheric Science: An Introductory Survey.

External links 
 Homepage
  Atmospheric Science:  An Introductory Survey, Second Edition by Wallace and Hobbs
 http://carg.atmos.washington.edu/sys/Hobbs-Seattle-PI.pdf
 

1936 births
2005 deaths
British meteorologists
British climatologists
Alumni of the University of London
University of Washington faculty